Bora Imani is a settlement in Kenya's Lamu County. The climate is tropical in Bora Imani. In winter, there is much less rainfall than in summer. This climate is considered to be Aw according to the Köppen-Geiger climate classification. In Bora Imani, the average annual temperature is 26.9 °C. The average annual rainfall is 914 mm.

References 

Populated places in Coast Province
Lamu County